Gao Ling (born 14 March 1979) is a Chinese former badminton player.

Career

Noted for her consistency, anticipation, forecourt prowess, and sporting smile, Gao is one of the most successful doubles players in the history of women's badminton. Her four Olympic badminton medals are the most of any player.

She has won titles at almost every top tier tournament in the world. Gao has earned four gold medals (among nine medals in total) at the BWF World Championships, three of them in women's doubles with Huang Sui (2001, 2003, and 2006) and one of them in mixed doubles with Zhang Jun (2001). She and Zhang Jun won consecutive gold medals in mixed doubles at the 2000 and 2004 Olympics, overcoming severe tests in both.

Gao has not earned an Olympic gold medal in women's doubles, a relative gap in her resume, but earned a bronze medal in 2000 with Qin Yiyuan, and a silver medal with Huang Sui in 2004. From 2001 through 2006 she and Huang captured a record six consecutive women's doubles titles at the venerable All-England Championships. Their All-England streak was finally broken in the semifinals of the 2007 tournament by fellow countrywomen Zhang Yawen and Wei Yili. Gao has shared five All-England mixed doubles titles: three with Zhang Jun (2001, 2003, and 2006), and two with Zheng Bo (2007 and 2008).

She has been a member of the perennial world champion Chinese Uber Cup (women's international) team since 2000. Gao Ling received an award during a ceremony to mark her retirement with five other teammates from the Chinese national badminton team on the sidelines of the China Open badminton event in Shanghai, November 23, 2008.  However, she was still playing a year later by partnering with Wei Yili. They lost to Yang Wei and Zhang Jiewen in the Thailand Open final of 2009, but won the Philippines Open of 2009.

Achievements

Olympic Games 
Women's doubles

Mixed doubles

World Championships 
Women's doubles

Mixed doubles

World Cup 
Women's doubles

Mixed doubles

Asian Games 
Women's doubles

Mixed doubles

Asian Championships 
Women's doubles

Mixed doubles

World Junior Championships 
Girls' doubles

Mixed doubles

Asian Junior Championships 
Girls' doubles

Mixed doubles

BWF Superseries (11 titles, 3 runner-ups) 
The BWF Superseries, launched on 14 December 2006 and implemented in 2007, is a series of elite badminton tournaments, sanctioned by Badminton World Federation (BWF). BWF Superseries has two level such as Superseries and Superseries Premier. A season of Superseries features twelve tournaments around the world, which introduced since 2011, with successful players invited to the Superseries Finals held at the year end.

Women's doubles

Mixed doubles

 BWF Superseries Finals tournament
 BWF Superseries Premier tournament
 BWF Superseries tournament

BWF Grand Prix (40 titles, 27 runner-ups) 
The BWF Grand Prix has two levels, the Grand Prix Gold and Grand Prix. It is a series of badminton tournaments, sanctioned by the Badminton World Federation (BWF) since 2007. The World Badminton Grand Prix has been sanctioned by the International Badminton Federation since 1983.

Women's doubles

Mixed doubles

 BWF Grand Prix Gold tournament
 BWF & IBF Grand Prix tournament

IBF International 
Women's doubles

References

External links
 
 
 
 
 

Badminton players at the 2000 Summer Olympics
Badminton players at the 2004 Summer Olympics
Badminton players at the 2008 Summer Olympics
Olympic badminton players of China
Olympic bronze medalists for China
Olympic gold medalists for China
Olympic silver medalists for China
Olympic medalists in badminton
Asian Games medalists in badminton
Badminton players from Wuhan
China University of Geosciences alumni
1979 births
Living people
Badminton players at the 2006 Asian Games
Badminton players at the 2002 Asian Games
Medalists at the 2004 Summer Olympics
Chinese female badminton players
Medalists at the 2000 Summer Olympics
Chinese police officers
Asian Games gold medalists for China
Asian Games silver medalists for China
Medalists at the 2002 Asian Games
Medalists at the 2006 Asian Games
21st-century Chinese women